On Acting is a book by Laurence Olivier. It was first published in 1986 when the actor was 79 years old. It consists partly of autobiographical reminiscences, partly of reflections on the actor's vocation.

Contents
Prologue

Part One: Before the Curtain
1. Beginnings
2. Lessons from the Past

Part Two: The Great Shakespearean Roles
3. Hamlet
4. Henry V
5. Macbeth
6. Richard III
7. King Lear
8. Othello
9. Antony and Cleopatra
10. The Merchant of Venice

Part Three: Contemporary Influences
11. Knights of the Theatre
12. Breakthrough
13. Colossus of the Drama

Part Four: The Silver Screen
14. Early Hollywood
15. Shakespeare on Film
16. In Front of the Camera

Part Five: Reflections
17. On Acting
Epilogue: A Letter to a Young Actress

List of Performances
Index

Quotations

From the essay 'On Acting'

[...]

[...]

[...]

[...]

[...]

From Part Two

On Antony and Cleopatra:

On Antony:

Why Othello is such a difficult part:

From various other parts

Non-fiction books about acting
Show business memoirs
1986 non-fiction books
Laurence Olivier